George Godfrey Becker (26 July 1877 – 23 April 1941) was an Australian politician. He was born in Brighton, Tasmania. In 1912 he was elected to the Tasmanian House of Assembly as a Labor member for Bass. He served as a minister from 1925 to 1928 but was defeated in 1931. In 1934 he was re-elected as an Independent Labor member for Wilmot, rejoining the party in 1937. He died in office in 1941.

References

1877 births
1941 deaths
Australian Labor Party members of the Parliament of Tasmania
Independent members of the Parliament of Tasmania
Members of the Tasmanian House of Assembly